Liley is a surname, and may refer to:

Names
 John Liley, rugby player
 Rob Liley, rugby player
 William Liley, surgeon

Award
 Liley Medal